Valle Chico Hot Springs is a subaerial thermal spring located at in the Sierra San Pedro Martir mountains of Baja California, Mexico.

Location 
The springs are located Southwest of the town of San Felipe at an elevation of 2,041 feet. The GPS coordinates are N 30 38.85 W 115 12.41. There is a ramada, fence and line shack at the location. Wildlife in the area include bobcats, pumas, coyotes, wild pigs, mountain sheep, fox, ringtails, racoons, badgers, and jackrabbits.

Water profile 
The hot mineral water emerges from a meteoric source at 144°F and flows into a cold water stream, cooling the water in a nearby soaking area to 110°F. The mineral waters are alkaline with a pH from 8.5 to 8.8. A 1988 study  (Giggenbach, 1988) states that a Na/K geothermometer measured temperatures between 136 °C and 169 °C.

See also
 List of hot springs in the United States
 List of hot springs in the world

References 

Hot springs of Mexico
Baja California